Johnny Andrews is an American songwriter and record producer based in Atlanta, Georgia, and Nashville, Tennessee. Andrews has written multiple number one singles, including "I Am Machine" and "Painkiller" by Three Days Grace, "Freak Like Me" by Halestorm, and "Stand Up" by All That Remains. In addition to these bands, Andrews' songs have been performed by Apocalyptica featuring Corey Taylor ("Slipknot"), and Gavin Rossdale, Theory of a Deadman, Motionless In White, Flyleaf, Red, Sick Puppies, and Chiodos.

Writing credits

2007

2008

2009

2010

2011 – 2012

2013

2014

2015

2016

2017

2018

2019

Production
Getaway – producer, composer
Right to Rise – producer, engineer, drum engineering, composer
Do You Wanna Start a War – composer, producer, programming

References

External links
Official website
AllMusic

Year of birth missing (living people)
Place of birth missing (living people)
Living people
Record producers from Tennessee
Record producers from Georgia (U.S. state)
Songwriters from Tennessee
Songwriters from Georgia (U.S. state)
Musicians from Atlanta
Musicians from Nashville, Tennessee
Writers from Atlanta